Jandakot is an electoral district of the Legislative Assembly in the Australian state of Western Australia.

The district is based in the southern suburbs of Perth and is named for the suburb of Jandakot. It also includes the suburbs of Canning Vale (part), Forrestdale, Harrisdale, Leeming, Piara Waters and Treeby.

Politically, the district is a marginal one. Based on the results of the 2005 state election, the district was created with a Labor Party majority of 53.6% to 46.4% versus the Liberal Party.

History

Jandakot was first created in 1988 for the 1989 state election, largely replacing the abolished seat of Murdoch. It contained the suburbs of Bull Creek, Leeming and western and southern Willetton, as well as part of Canning Vale and Jandakot Airport.

Its first member was the then Liberal Opposition Leader, Barry MacKinnon. MacKinnon retired from politics in 1993 after being ousted as leader in favour of Richard Court a year earlier, and Mike Board, who later became a Minister in the Court government, won the seat in his stead. The name Murdoch was restored by the 1994 redistribution, taking effect at the 1996 state election.

A new seat named Jandakot was created ahead of the 2008 state election when the number of metropolitan seats was increased in accordance with the new one vote one value legislation on 29 October 2007. The new district was drawn from parts of the existing electorates of Cockburn, Murdoch, Riverton, Serpentine-Jarrahdale and Southern River.

Population growth on Perth's outer predicated re-drawing of the state electoral boundaries again in 2015 ahead of the 2017 State Election, with the seat of Jandakot shifting eastward.

Members for Jandakot

Election results

References

External links
 

Electoral districts of Western Australia